Eugène Genet (20 April 1850, Chalon-sur-Saône - 21 April 1904) was a French politician belonging to the Radical Party. He was a member of the Chamber of Deputies from 1893 to 1904.

References

1850 births
1904 deaths
People from Chalon-sur-Saône
Politicians from Bourgogne-Franche-Comté
Radical Party (France) politicians
Members of the 6th Chamber of Deputies of the French Third Republic
Members of the 7th Chamber of Deputies of the French Third Republic
Members of the 8th Chamber of Deputies of the French Third Republic